Ricardo Munguía Padilla (April 3, 1944 – February 17, 2007) was a Mexican footballer. Munguía, nicknamed El Ringo, played as a defender.

His son Ricardo Munguía Pérez (also nicknamed Ringo) is also a footballer.

References

External links
 NASL Jerseys profile

1944 births
2007 deaths
Footballers from Mexico City
Mexican expatriate footballers
Mexican footballers
Baltimore Bays players
Club América footballers
C.D. Veracruz footballers
San Diego Toros players
San Luis F.C. players
Dallas Tornado players
North American Soccer League (1968–1984) players
Expatriate soccer players in the United States
Mexican expatriate sportspeople in the United States
Association football defenders